The 2001 Philippine Basketball Association (PBA) PBA Commissioner's Cup was the second conference of the 2001 PBA season. It started on June 2 and ended on August 24, 2001. The tournament is an Import-laden format, which requires an import or a pure-foreign player for each team.

Format
The following format will be observed for the duration of the conference:
 One-round robin eliminations; 9 games per team; Teams are then seeded by basis on win–loss records. 
 The top eight teams after the eliminations will advance to the quarterfinals.
Quarterfinals:
Top four teams will have a twice-to-beat advantage against their opponent.
QF1: #1 vs. #8
QF2: #2 vs. #7
QF3: #3 vs. #6
QF4: #4 vs. #5
Best-of-five semifinals:
SF1: QF1 vs. QF4
SF2: QF2 vs. QF3
Third-place playoff: losers of the semifinals
Best-of-seven finals: winners of the semifinals

Imports
The following is the list of imports with the replacement imports being highlighted. GP is the number of games played in the conference.

Elimination round

Team standings

Seventh seed playoff

Eighth seed playoff

Bracket

Quarterfinals

(1) San Miguel vs. (8) Mobiline

(2) Purefoods vs. (7) Tanduay

(3) Red Bull vs. (6) Barangay Ginebra

(4) Alaska vs. (5) Sta. Lucia

Semifinals

(1) San Miguel vs. (4) Alaska

(2) Purefoods vs. (3) Red Bull

Third place playoff

Finals

References

External links
 PBA.ph

PBA Commissioner's Cup
Commissioner's Cup